Temple Crag is a mountain peak in the Palisades group of peaks of the Sierra Nevada with an elevation of . The peak lies east of the Sierra Crest, between Mount Gayley and Mount Alice, straddling the drainages of the North and South Forks of Big Pine Creek. The peak's north face forms the backdrop for part of the North Fork Big Pine Creek hiking trail in the John Muir Wilderness and Inyo National Forest. It is also a rock climbing destination, with its arêtes hosting the routes Venusian Blind, Moon Goddess Arete, Sun Ribbon Arete, and Dark Star.

See also
 Mountain peaks of California
 The Palisades of the Sierra Nevada

References

External links
 
 

Temple Crag
Mountains of Inyo County, California
Mountains of Northern California